The 2012 Erie Explosion season was the sixth season for the indoor American football franchise, and their first as a member of the Northern Conference of the United Indoor Football League (UIFL).

On August 25, 2011, the Explosion left the Southern Indoor Football League (SIFL) and joined the United Indoor Football League. The change reunited Erie with Andrew Haines, who founded the city's previous indoor football team, the Erie Freeze. (The Explosion's departure came two weeks before the SIFL broke up into the Lone Star Football League and the Professional Indoor Football League, neither of which included Pennsylvania in their territories.) Erie was tasked with replacing MVP quarterback DiMichele, who had signed with the Arena Football League's Philadelphia Soul. The job fell on the shoulders of rookie Colton Hansen. In the second game of the season, Hansen struggled in a loss to the Johnstown Generals, and he was replaced by A. J. McKenna. McKenna lead the Explosion to 8–3 regular season record, just losing the top seed in the UIFL North during the last game of the season. While still securing a home playoff game, the Tullio Arena had begun a 45 million dollar renovation, that forced the Explosion to find a new place to host the game. The Explosion announced that they would play at Erie Cathedral Prep's Dollinger Field. The Explosion trailed going into the fourth quarter against the Marion Blue Racers, but McKenna ignited the Erie offense to 22 points in the final stanza to advance to the UIFL North Conference final.

The Explosion faced the Cincinnati Commandos, who had only lost 2 games all season, one of which was to Erie. With the Commando quarterback Tyler Sheehan out with an injury, the Commandos used Kynes Mincy at quarterback, who provided a duel-threat option. Mincy lead the Commandos to 8 scores, defeating the Explosion 62-40 to advance to the Ultimate Bowl.

Schedule
Key:

Regular season

Postseason

Standings

Roster

Coaching staff

References

Erie Explosion
Erie Explosion seasons
Erie Explosion